Bobosi Byaruhanga (born 3 December 2001) is a Ugandan footballer who currently plays as a midfielder for American side Austin FC II, on loan from Vyškov.

Club career
Byaruhanga started his career with Vipers, progressing through the academy to win two league titles and the 2021 Airtel FUFA Male player of the year. In June 2022, he was linked with a move away from the club, and in August 2022, he made the move to the Czech Republic, joining Czech National Football League side Vyškov.

In January 2023, he moved to American side Austin FC II on a season-long loan, with a purchase option.

Career statistics

Club

Notes

International

Honours
Vipers
Uganda Premier League: Champions: 2022
Uganda Cup: Champions: 2021
Uganda U20
Africa U-20 Cup of Nations; Runner-up: 2021

References

2001 births
Living people
Ugandan footballers
Uganda youth international footballers
Uganda international footballers
Association football midfielders
Uganda Premier League players
Vipers SC players
MFK Vyškov players
Austin FC players
Ugandan expatriate footballers
Ugandan expatriate sportspeople in the Czech Republic
Expatriate footballers in the Czech Republic
Ugandan expatriate sportspeople in the United States
Expatriate soccer players in the United States